Curteys is a surname. Notable people with the surname include:

 Richard Curteys (c. 1532 – 1582), English churchman
 Griffin Curteys (by 1521 – 1587), English estate steward
 John Curteys (MP for Lostwithiel), member of Parliament for Lostwithiel
 John Curteys (MP for Marlborough), member of Parliament for Marlborough